Roberta is a 1951 Filipino drama film based on the Tagalog Klasiks character of the same name by Mars Ravelo. Directed by Olive La Torre, it stars child actress Tessie Agana as the titular character, alongside Van de Leon, Bella Flores, Maria Cristina, Rosa Mia, José de Villa, Aruray, Boy Alano and Tony Cayado. Produced by Sampaguita Pictures on a low budget after a fire destroyed the studio's film library, it was released in 1951, and was an unprecedented box office success. It won two Maria Clara Awards, for Best Supporting Actress (Mia) and Best Cinematography (Higino Fallorina), and has since been credited with propelling the studio's revival in the early 1950s.

Cast
Tessie Agana as Roberta
Van de Leon as Roberta's father
Bella Flores as a bar girl
Maria Cristina
Rosa Mia
José de Villa
Aruray
Boy Alano
Tony Cayado
Candida Valderrama
Pablo Raymundo
Ric Flores
Pablo Naval
Helen Miraflor
Batotoy

Release
Released in theaters in 1951, Roberta achieved unprecedented box office success, becoming the highest-grossing Philippine film of all time and holding the record for nearly ten years. It has been credited with reviving Sampaguita Pictures which at the time was attempting to recover from low finances after a fire destroyed thousands of film reels stored in its library.

A remake was planned in 1990, with Ice Seguerra as Roberta and Bibeth Orteza as screenwriter, though it did not come to fruition.

Accolades
Rosa Mia and Higino J. Fallorina won the Maria Clara Awards for Best Supporting Actress and Best Cinematography respectively.

References

External links

1951 films
1951 drama films
Tagalog-language films
Films based on Philippine comics
Philippine drama films
Philippine films based on comics